Pilgrim is a fantasy radio series by Sebastian Baczkiewicz and produced by BBC Radio and starring Paul Hilton as William Palmer, known as Pilgrim. It is a tale of a hero cursed with immortality and forced to wander for eternity between the worlds of magic and mortals. The first series was first broadcast on Radio 4 in 2008.

Premise
In 1185, while making a pilgrimage to Canterbury, William Palmer happens to mention in conversation that he hopes the Church in England will soon eradicate the foolish belief in the Otherworld. Unfortunately for William, his fellow pilgrim angrily reveals himself to be the king of the Greyfolk and places a curse on him that condemns him to roam endlessly between the two worlds. Known as Pilgrim, his mission is to maintain the uneasy balance between the worlds and to protect the human race from the enemy whose existence it stubbornly refuses to acknowledge. He undertakes a series of quests in the hope that the curse will be lifted, and finds himself, centuries later, in modern times.

Episodes

Series 1
 Episode 1: "He Who Would Valiant Be" – A stolen dragon's egg must be retrieved by a hero cursed with immortality.
 Episode 2: "Then Fancies Flee Away" – Humankind's hero is forced to help a young lad who has lain in a coma for seven years.
 Episode 3: "No Foes Shall Stay His Might" – A hunter is after Pilgrim, who tries to save himself by rescuing a young girl.
 Episode 4: "'Gainst All Disaster" – Humankind's immortal hero must help Joseph of Arimathea, held captive by a malevolent angel.

Series 2
 Episode 1: "The Drowned Church" – Humanity's ageless champion returns to stop a sinister church congregation under the sea.
 Episode 2: "The Lost Hotel" – The mystical, timeless man finds himself an unwilling guest at a sinister hotel.
 Episode 3: "The Lady in the Lake" – The ageless wanderer is drawn to a magical fiddle player and finds a tragic love triangle.
 Episode 4: "Hope Springs" – The roaming immortal reunites with his daughter, Doris but learns that an old foe is on his trail.

Series 3
 Episode 1: "Crowsfall Wood" – An old friend of Pilgrim's is possessed by a deadly forest spirit.
 Episode 2: "Sookey Hill" – Pilgrim investigates a story about a man being turned into a hare.
 Episode 3: "Aisley Bridge" – Pilgrim is drawn into the world of the Lanes, and the immortal children who live there.
 Episode 4: "Lindie Island" – Pilgrim is asked to sacrifice a man he has kept safe for centuries.

Series 4
 Episode 1: "Mullerby Fair" – The immortal wanderer William Palmer has to fight the malevolent Mr Speed.
 Episode 2: "Tregarrah Head" – Pilgrim has to rescue the Old Man of Tregarrah Head from his fate.
 Episode 3: "Wedlowe Sound" – Pilgrim must tackle an old adversary and save the community of Wedlowe Sound.
 Episode 4: "Bleaker Lake" – Pilgrim hopes to find an end to the war of attrition with Birdie.

Series 5
 Episode 1: "Lyall Park" – The immortal wanderer William Palmer comes to Lyall Park.
 Episode 2: "Gallowstone Hill" – Pilgrim comes to a village cursed with a dangerous collective madness.
 Episode 3: "Woolmere Walter" – Pilgrim is forced to assist an odd couple in their very unusual courtship.
 Episode 4: "Parsons Mount" – Pilgrim's quest for Radiant Boy forces him to the one place he has been forbidden to go.

Series 6
 Episode 1: "Jackson's Mill" – Pilgrim discovers that an old friend is being haunted by a malevolent spirit.
 Episode 2: "St Lewin" – In search of silver and gold, Pilgrim comes to St Lewin.
 Episode 3: "Ouldmeadow Jack" – Pilgrim is still in search of gold to rescue those trapped in Hartley's mine.
 Episode 4: "Daventree Mansions" – Pilgrim returns to Jacksons Mill where Morgan and Hartley have prepared a nasty surprise.

Series 7
 Episode 1: "Clennan Court" – Pilgrim is on the trail of murderous magician Morgan Hambleton.
 Episode 2: "Stickton General" – Mushrooms and a dead body help Pilgrim track down his former close friend Morgan Hambleton
 Episode 3: "Shoulder Hill" – Pilgrim meets some old friends when he takes Morgan Hambleton to a stone circle.
 Episode 4: "Caudley Fair" – Pilgrim learns that Mr Delancey's daughter, India, has been abducted.
 Episode 5: "Bayldon Abbey" – Mr Delancey must release Pilgrim and his daughter from the enchantment of Caudley Fair.

Series 8 ("The Winter Queen")
Episode 1 – Every year, on the winter solstice, the small town of Melcombe observes a custom the roots and meaning of which are lost in the mists of time. A torchlit procession to the ancient tomb of Cairndale Knapp, overlooking the town, puts the old sun to bed and greets the new sun in the morning, restoring balance to the year.     
Episode 2 – This year, however, Mr Sam Notice has bought the Knapp and has set about landscaping it. And with the felling of an ancient yew tree, the roots and meaning of the old custom spring malevolently to life, as the Winter Queen is finally released from her prison and bent on revenge.

Series 9 ("The Timbermoor Imp")
First broadcast on BBC Radio 4 in October 2020 and billed as "a Hallowe'en adventure for the immortal mediator".
Episode 1 – Pilgrim donates an impossibly valuable artwork to Timbermoor Museum in order to keep it open and maintaining a particular shabby exhibit.
Episode 2 – Sally Mop's out and doing the bidding of a vindictive teenager, whether he likes it or not.

References

External links
Radio Listings (Pilgrim)

2011 radio dramas
2012 radio dramas
2013 radio dramas
2014 radio dramas
2015 radio dramas
2016 radio dramas
2020 radio dramas
BBC Radio dramas
Fictional characters with immortality